AmeriKKKa's Nightmare is the third studio album by American rapper Spice 1, released November 22, 1994, on Jive Records. The album was produced by Ant Banks, Battlecat, Blackjack, DJ Slip and Spice 1. It peaked at number 2 on the Billboard Top R&B/Hip-Hop Albums and at number 22 on the Billboard 200. One single, "Strap on the Side", peaked at number 74 on the Billboard Hot R&B/Hip-Hop Songs. This album is considered by many to be his most influential album, as well as containing guest appearances from major artists such as E-40, 2Pac, Method Man and 187 Fac. The album was certified gold by the RIAA.

Along with singles, music videos were released for two songs: "Strap on the Side" (featuring a cameo appearance by 2Pac), and "Face of a Desperate Man" (featuring a cameo appearance by G-Nut).

"Nigga Sings the Blues", was originally heard in the film, Jason's Lyric, and was also released on the film's soundtrack.

Critical reception 

Allmusic - "...AmeriKKKa's Nightmare appealed to hip-hoppers who had been savoring Dr. Dre's The Chronic in 1994...the CD manages to hold attention thanks to Spice's appealing flow (his rhyming skills are solid, to be sure) and the very Dre-ish produced tracks..."

Track listing

Charts

Weekly charts

Year-end charts

Singles

References

External links 
 [ AmeriKKKa's Nightmare] at Allmusic
 AmeriKKKa's Nightmare at Discogs
 AmeriKKKa's Nightmare at MusicBrainz
 AmeriKKKa's Nightmare at Tower Records

Spice 1 albums
1994 albums
Albums produced by Ant Banks
Albums produced by Battlecat (producer)
Jive Records albums
G-funk albums